John of Ibelin may refer to:

John of Ibelin, the Old Lord of Beirut (1179–1236), constable of Jerusalem, regent of the kingdoms of Jerusalem and Cyprus, opponent of Frederick II, Holy Roman Emperor
John II of Beirut (died 1264), grandson of the "Old Lord of Beirut"
John of Arsuf (c. 1211–1258), constable of Jerusalem
John of Ibelin (jurist) (1215–1266), count of Jaffa and Ascalon, bailli of Cyprus, and author of the Assizes of the Haute Cour of Jerusalem
John of Ibelin (died after 1250), grandson of John I of Beirut
John of Ibelin (1277–1309), Lord of Arsuf, grandson of John of Arsuf